Musée de l'Histoire de France (Museum of French History) may refer to: 
 the Musée de l'Histoire de France (Versailles), created by Louis-Philippe I in 1837; 
 the Musée des Archives Nationales, also known as musée de l'Histoire de France between 1939 and 2006; 

See also
 Musée des Monuments français (1795-1816)
 Musée des Souverains